Mike Leary (born 3 April 1944) is an Australian former professional rugby league footballer and executive. He played for the Penrith Panthers and Parramatta Eels in the NSWRFL between 1968 and 1973.

Leary is a native of Parkes, New South Wales and was a Country Firsts representative in 1967, prior to arriving at Penrith. A fullback, Leary was a three-time Penrith player of the year and later served the Panthers in various administrative roles. From 2008 to 2011 he was the club's Chief Executive Officer.

References

External links
Mike Leary at Rugby League project

1944 births
Living people
Australian rugby league players
Penrith Panthers players
Parramatta Eels players
Rugby league fullbacks
Rugby league players from New South Wales
Australian rugby league administrators